The Kingdom Holding Company (KHC) is a Saudi conglomerate holding company, based in Riyadh. The KHC is a publicly listed company on the Tadawul (Saudi stock exchange). The KHC consists of a select team of experienced investment specialists directed by its founder and chairman, Prince Al-Waleed bin Talal and chief executive officer, Eng. Talal Ibrahim Al Maiman. The company describes itself as a diversified investment company, whose main interests are financial services, real estate, tourism and hospitality, media, entertainment, petrochemicals, aviation and technology.

Present investments  
Present investments include:
 Four Seasons Hotels & Resorts (Canada-based) (owns 23.75% with Cascade Investment, LLC, and others)
 Fairmont Raffles Swissotel (minority ownership with Accor) 
 Hotel George V (100%) (France)
 KADCO Egypt (100%) (Egypt)
 Kingdom Hospital-Consulting Clinics  (100%) (Saudi Arabia)
 Kingdom Hotels Investments (100%) (Saudi Arabia) 
 Kingdom Schools (100%) (Saudi Arabia)
 Lebanese Broadcasting Corporation (100%) (Lebanon)
 Lyft (US)
 Flynas (33%) (Saudi Arabia)
 National Industrialization Company (100%) (Saudi Arabia)
 Rotana Group, the Arab world's largest entertainment company (100%) (Saudi Arabia)
 Twitter, Inc. (minority stake)

Past investments 
Past investments include:
 21st Century Fox (US / 6% minority stake, sold in 2017)
 360buy (China / now publicly traded as JD.com) 
 Amazon (US)
 AOL / Time Warner (US)
 Apple (US)
 Canary Wharf  (UK)
 Citigroup (US)
 The Coca-Cola Company (US)
 Compaq (US)
 eBay (US)
 EuroDisney (France / now owned by The Walt Disney Company on a 87.15%)
 Ford (US)
 Hewlett-Packard (US)
 McDonald's (US)
 Motorola Mobility (US)
Mövenpick Hotels & Resorts (Switzerland / 33% minority stake, sold in 2018 to Accor)
 News Corporation (US)
 PepsiCo (US)
 Priceline.com (US)
 Procter & Gamble (US)
 The Savola Group (Saudi Arabia)
 Saks Incorporated (US)
 SAMBA, Saudi American Bank (US)
 Marvel Comics (US)
 The Walt Disney Company (US)

The company is known for hiring the first Saudi female commercial pilot, Captain Hanadi Zakaria al-Hindi, who trained at the Mideast Aviation Academy in Jordan.

It is the owner of and was the lead developer of the Kingdom Centre in Riyadh, Saudi Arabia.

Kingdom Holding is an active investor in sub-saharan Africa through Kingdom Africa Management, a private equity firm and subsidiary based in South Africa, Ghana and Nigeria. Kingdom Africa is run by J. Kofi Bucknor and focuses on growth equity investments.

In 2007, the company committed to purchasing an Airbus A380 "Flying Palace" for $485 million, however according to the Kingdom Holding's chief financial officer the plane has been sold.

In April 2010, the company sold part of its stake in Raffles Holdings International in a deal worth about $847 million to a group of investors, including an affiliate of Qatar’s sovereign wealth fund.

In August 2011, the company announced plans for the construction of Jeddah Tower, which will become the tallest building in the world.

References

External links 

Companies listed on Tadawul
Companies based in Riyadh
Economic history of Saudi Arabia
Holding companies established in 1980
Holding companies of Saudi Arabia
Investment companies of Saudi Arabia
Sovereign wealth funds
Saudi Arabian companies established in 1980